Inner World is the debut studio album by the 14th Dalai Lama, released under the name Dalai Lama. It was released on the Dalai Lama's 85th birthday, 6 July 2020. It is the first time The Dalai Lama has released recorded music. The album debuted on multiple Billboard Album Charts: #1 Billboard New Age Chart, #4 Top New Artist Album, #8 Billboard World Music, #13 Record Label Independent Album, #14 Current Digital Album, #17 Digital Album, #43 Top New Artist - Consumption, #55 Top Current Album, #98 Billboard Top Album, #125 Top Albums w/TEA

Track listing

Personnel
Tenzin Gyatso, spoken word

Music
Abraham Kunin
Junelle Kunin
Anoushka Shankar
Daniel Ryland
Gandhaar Amin
Alex Freer
Jeff Atmajian
Marika Hodgson
Stephanie Brown
Fen Ikner
Finn Scholes
Cass Basil
Guy Harrison
Russell McNaughton
John Davis
Scott Thomas
Kingsley Melhuish
Nastasia Wolfgramm
Mahuia Bridgman-Cooper

Production
Charles Goldstuck – executive production
Junelle Kunin – recording, executive production
Abraham Kunin – recording, composition, production
Randy Merrill – mastering
Aaron Nevezie – mixing

Charts

References

14th Dalai Lama albums
2020 debut albums